AMG 319 is a drug developed by Amgen which acts as an inhibitor of the phosphoinositide 3-kinase enzyme subtype PI3Kδ. It was originally developed as an anti-inflammatory drug with potential applications in the treatment of autoimmune conditions such as rheumatoid arthritis, but subsequent research showed that it inhibits cell proliferation and might potentially have useful anti-cancer effects, and it has been put into clinical trials to assess its safety and tolerability in this application.

Mechanism(s) of action
It is a potential immunotherapy because blocking PI3Kδ (PI3K p110δ) eliminates a group of inhibitory immune cells and may allow the immune system to better attack the cancer cells.  p110δ inactivation in regulatory T  cells unleashes CD8+ cytotoxic T  cells.

Clinical trials
Its first clinical trial was a phase I/II study in adults with relapsed or refractory lymphoid malignancies. This was due to run from 2011 to 2013.

In 2015/16 it started a phase II clinical trial as a neoadjuvant therapy for human papillomavirus (HPV) negative head and neck squamous-cell carcinoma (HNSCC) (prior to resection surgery).

See also 
 Duvelisib
 Idelalisib

References 

Experimental cancer drugs
Fluoroarenes
Phosphoinositide 3-kinase inhibitors
Purines
2-Pyridyl compounds
Quinolines